Papilio indra, the Indra swallowtail, short-tailed black swallowtail, or cliff swallowtail, is a western North American butterfly in the family Papilionidae.

Description
The Indra swallowtail is a black swallowtail similar in coloration to the black swallowtail and the short-tailed swallowtail. It has very short tails and has dark blue crescents on the topside of the hindwing.

Habitat
This butterfly may be found in rugged, arid, or mountainous countrysides.

Flight
The Indra swallowtail has one brood per year and is on the wing in spring in southern or lower altitudes but early summer in northern or higher altitudes.

Subspecies
Listed alphabetically:

There is an as-yet unnamed subspecies that has been referred to as bonnevillensis by some and as the "Utah-West Desert segregate" by others.

P. i. calcicola Emmel & Griffin, 1998
P. i. fordi Comstock & Martin, 1956
P. i. indra Reakirt, 1866
P. i. kaibabensis Bauer, 1955
P. i. martini T. & J. Emmel, 1966
P. i. minori Cross, 1936
P. i. nevadensis T. & J. Emmel, 1971
P. i. panamintensis Emmel, 1982
P. i. pygmaeus J. Emmel, T. Emmel & Griffin, 1998
P. i. pergamus H. Edwards, 1874
P. i. phyllisae J. Emmel, 1982
P. i. shastensis Emmel & Emmel, 1998

Food plants
Parsley family.

References

Emmel, J.F. and Emmel,T.C., 1964. The life history of Papilio indra minori. Journal of the Lepidopterists' Society 18: 65-73.pdf
Emmel, T.C. and Emmel, J.F., 1967. The biology of Papilio indra kaibabensis in the Grand Canyon. Journal of the Lepidopterists' Society 21: 41-49. pdf
Emmel, J.F. and Emmel, T.C., 1968. The population biology and life history of Papilio indra martini. Journal of the Lepidopterists' Society 22: 46-52.pdf

Butterflies of North America
indra
Butterflies described in 1866
Taxa named by Tryon Reakirt